Olabisi Onabanjo University, Ago-Iwoye is a state owned and operated university located in Ago-Iwoye, Ogun State, Nigeria. The university was founded on 7 July 1982 as Ogun State University (OSU) and was renamed Olabisi Onabanjo University on 29 May 2001, in honour of Chief (Dr.) Olabisi Onabanjo, whose efforts as the then civilian governor of Ogun State gave birth to the university. Meanwhile, many students still refer to the institution as OSU, an acronym for the former name.

The university had a total output of 10,291 graduates and 1,697 postgraduates.

Olabisi Onabanjo University has multiple campuses. The Main Campus in Ago-Iwoye is popularly called Permanent Site (PS) by the students and a Mini Campus which was the home of the Faculty of Science till it was moved to the permanent site in January 2013. Faculty of Agriculture is in Aiyetoro, faculty of Engineering is in Ibogun, College of Medicine, faculties of Basic Medical Sciences and Pharmacy are in Shagamu. Students and alumni of the Olabisi Onabanjo University are addressed as ‘Great OOUITES.’

Information and activities amidst Students are communicated through the school's portal as well as notable privately owned magazines/ Social media handles such as 'OOU Media' 'OOU Campus Mirror' 'OOU Press club', 'OOU Update', 'OOU Gazette', 'OOU Premium', 'OOU Parrot', 'Inside OOU magazine', 'OOU Vanguard', and a few others.

The mini campus OOU, Centre for Continuous Education (CCED) is now the pre degree studies unit, Diploma and Jupeb while the main campus is the heart of Undergraduates programs.

Faculties and departments
The university has ten faculties including total number of fifty-six departments which are spread across its campuses in the state. They include:

Faculty of Science
 Department of Chemical Sciences
 Department of Mathematical Sciences
 Department of Microbiology 
 Department of Plant Science
 Department of Zoology and Environmental Biology
 Department of Physics
 Department of Earth Sciences

Faculty of Education
 Department of Educational Foundations and Counselling
 Department of Educational Management and Business Studies
 Department of Human Kinetics and Health Education 
 Department of Science and Technology Education 
 Department of Arts and Social Sciences Education

Faculty of Law
 Department of Commercial Law
 Department of International Jurisprudence 
 Department of Private Law
 Department of Public Law

Faculty of Art
 Department of English and Performing Arts
 Department of Religious Studies
 Department of History and Diplomatic Studies
 Department of Nigerian and Foreign Languages 
 Department of Philosophy

Faculty of Social Sciences
 Department of Mass communication
 Department of Psychology 
 Department of Economics
 Department of Geography and Regional Planning 
 Department of Political Sciences 
 Department of Banking and Finance

Faculty of Basic Medical Sciences
 Department of Haematology and Blood Transfusion 
 Department of Chemical Pathology 
 Department of Medical Microbiology and Parasitology
 Department of Morbid Anatomy Histopathology
 Department of Physiology 
 Department of Anatomy 
 Department of Biochemistry
 Department of Pharmacology

Faculty of Clinical Sciences
 Department of Community Medicine and Primary Care
 Department of Medicine 
 Department of Anaesthesia 
 Department of Surgery 
 Department of Radiology 
 Department of Paediatrics
 Department of Obstetrics and Gynecology

Faculty of Pharmacy
 Department of Pharmacy/Biopharmacy 
 Department of Pharmaceutics/Pharmaceutical Technology 
 Department of Pharmaceutical Medicinal Chemistry
 Department of Pharmaceutical Microbiology

Faculty of Engineering and Environmental Sciences
 Department of Computer Engineering 
 Department of Mechanical Engineering 
 Department of Electrical/Electronics Engineering
Department of Agricultural Engineering 
 Department of Civil Engineering 
 Department of Fine and Applied Arts
 Department of Urban and Regional Planning
 Department of Architecture

Faculty of Agricultural Sciences
 Department of Crop Production 
 Department of Animal Production 
 Department of Home and Hotel Management
Department of Cooperative and Business management 
Department of Agricultural Economics 
Department of Agricultural extension

Vice chancellors
Professor John Olubi Sodipo, (November 1982-December 1990)
 Professor T. O Bamkole, (January 1991-March 1995)
Professor O. Y Oyeneye, April 1995-November 1999
 Professor Layi Ogunkoya, November 1999-March 2001
Professor Afolabi Soyode, April 2001-Jan 2006
Professor  Odutola Osilesi 2006-2009
Professor Sofola Olusoga, 2009 
Professor Wale Olaitan (2009-2013).
Professor Saburi Adejimi August 2013 - May  2017
Professor Ganiyu Olatunji Olatunde May 2017 – October 2022
Professor Agboola Ayodeji Johnson, October 2022 - till date

Administrative and Principal Officers
The school is being governed by the administrative officers (which consist of the Visitor, Pro-Chancellor, Vice Chancellor and The ) and the principal officers (which consist of Deputy Vice Chancellor, Registrar, Bursar and Acting University Librarian). Names and position of administrative officers

Notable alumni

Amongst the alumni of Olabisi Onabanjo University are:
 
 
Toyin Abraham, award-winning Nollywood actor
Lateef Adedimeji, award-winning Nollywood Actor
Zainab Ahmed, current Minister of finance
Liz Anjorin, actress
Segun Awolowo, Nigerian Lawyer 
Kehinde Bankole, TV host, model and nollywood actress
Ibrahim Bio, minister
Sodamola Oluseye Desmond, aka DJ Spinall
Emamode Edosio, popular filmmaker 
Kunle Idowu, aka Frank Donga
Kaffy, dancer
Boluwaji Kunlere, politician 
Titilope Lawoyin, former MBGN as Ann Suinner
Sunny Melody, juju musician
Empress Njamah, Nollywood actress
Albert Odulele, pastor, televangelist and revelator
Ronke Odusanya,  Yoruba-language film actress
Uchechukwu Sampson Ogah, entrepreneur 
Debola Ogunseye, football player
Yetunde Onanuga, Deputy Governor Ogun state 
Lola Shoneyin, Nigerian poet and author 
Toun Okewale Sonaiya, radio broadcaster 
Sunkanmi, songwriter and singer
Weird MC, rapper

See also
Olabisi Onabanjo University Teaching Hospital

References 

 
Educational institutions established in 1982
Public universities in Nigeria
1982 establishments in Nigeria
Education in Ogun State